The John R. Rollins School is a historic school at 451 Howard Street in Lawrence, Massachusetts.  The three story brick structure was built in 1892 in the Richardsonian Romanesque style, and is a prominent feature of the Prospect Hill neighborhood, visible from nearby Interstate 495.  It is named for John Rodman Rollins (1817-1892), a local politician who served both as mayor and superintendent of schools.

The building was listed on the National Register of Historic Places in 2000.  It is still in use as a school.

See also
National Register of Historic Places listings in Lawrence, Massachusetts
National Register of Historic Places listings in Essex County, Massachusetts

References

School buildings completed in 1892
Buildings and structures in Lawrence, Massachusetts
School buildings on the National Register of Historic Places in Massachusetts
National Register of Historic Places in Lawrence, Massachusetts